Bernardo Álvarez Herrera (Carora, Lara State, 18 August 1956 – 25 November 2016) was Venezuela's ambassador to the United States from 2003 to 2010 (with an interruption from mid-2008 to mid-2009, when Venezuela withdrew its ambassador) and Deputy Minister of Foreign Relations.

Born in Carora, Álvarez Herrera held a degree in political science from the Universidad Central de Venezuela and a master's degree in development studies from the University of Sussex in England. Beginning in 1982, he served as a professor at the Universidad Central's School of Political and Administrative Studies. His other previous positions included; deputy minister of hydrocarbons (2000–03) and director-general of hydrocarbons (1999–2000) at the Ministry of Energy and Mines. From 1994 to 1999 he was a member of the Venezuelan Chamber of Deputies.

In September 2008, Herrera was expelled from the United States after Venezuelan President Hugo Chavez accused his American counterpart of conspiring to overthrow his regime and ordered him to leave the country. He was restored to his post after the Venezuelan and US governments agreed to re-establish diplomatic relations.

In December 2010, the U.S. government again expelled Alvarez in response to President Hugo Chavez's refusal to accept President Obama's nomination of Larry Palmer.

He also served as Venezuela's ambassador to Spain from 2011 to 2013. In fall of 2013, he was appointed secretary general of ALBA, the Bolivarian Alliance for the Americas.

On 2 October 2015. Álvarez was designated Ambassador Permanent Representative of Venezuela to the Organization of American States (OAS).

On 13 May 2016, without leaving his ambassadorship post, Álvarez was designated Acting Deputy Minister for North America.

He died of a heart attack on 25 November 2016 in Caracas. He was married and had three children.

References

External links
Official Profile Embassy of the Bolivarian Republic of Venezuela in the United States of America
  The Washington Diplomat Newspaper – Ambassador Profile 
 Bernardo Álvarez Herrera, "A Benign Revolution: In Defense of Hugo Chávez" July/August 2006 Foreign Affairs
"Hugo Chávez's Venezuela" 18 January 2006 The Washington Post
 Bernardo Álvarez Herrera, 29 July 2010, Foreign Policy, Colombia Kicks Over the Negotiating Table

1956 births
2016 deaths
People from Lara (state)
Ambassadors of Venezuela to the United States
Members of the Venezuelan Chamber of Deputies
Academic staff of the Central University of Venezuela
Central University of Venezuela alumni
Alumni of the University of Sussex
United States–Venezuela relations
Venezuelan diplomats